Osterrönfeld is a municipality in the district of Rendsburg-Eckernförde, in Schleswig-Holstein, Germany. It is situated on the Kiel Canal, approx. 2 km southeast of Rendsburg.

Osterrönfeld is also the seat of the Amt ("collective municipality") Eiderkanal, which consists of the following municipalities:

Bovenau
Haßmoor
Ostenfeld
Osterrönfeld
Rade b. Rendsburg
Schacht-Audorf
Schülldorf

References

Rendsburg-Eckernförde